William Ellisworth Artis (February 2, 1914 –  April 3, 1977) was an African-American sculptor, whose favorite medium was clay.  The freedom of modeling gave him a broad range of expression.  During the latter part of his life, he began to focus on potting.

Biography
Born in Washington, North Carolina, he moved to New York as a teen in 1927. Professor Artis died at North Port , Long Island, New York on April 3, 1977.

Career 
He was a pupil of Augusta Savage and exhibited with the Harmon Foundation. 
He was featured in the 1930s film A Study of Negro Artists, along with Savage and other artists associated with the Harlem Renaissance, including Richmond Barthé, James Latimer Allen, Palmer Hayden, Aaron Douglas, William Ellisworth Artis, William Ellisworth Artis, Lois Mailou Jones, and Georgette Seabrooke.

He taught at the Harlem YMCA after finishing high school, then was involved with Works Progress Administration's artists project.

From 1941 to 1945, he served in the U.S. Army during World War II. After the war, he earned his academic degrees.  Artis studied at the Art Students League of New York and Syracuse University, where he worked with Ivan Meštrović.  After leaving Syracuse, he taught at Pine Ridge Indian Reservation in South Dakota.

In 1945, Artis, with fellow artist Romare Bearden and Selma Burke, were together in the landmark Albany Institute of History and Art exhibit and over the next decade found the black artist making inroads in national exhibits and major galleries.

In 1954 he joined the faculty of Nebraska State Teachers College.  He later taught at Chadron State College, where from 1956 to 1966 he was Professor of Ceramics, and at Mankato State College, Minnesota, as Professor of Art until ill health forced him to retire in 1975.

Gallery

References

Biography at the African American Registry

1914 births
1977 deaths
People from Washington, North Carolina
African-American sculptors
Sculptors from North Carolina
Art Students League of New York alumni
Syracuse University alumni
Chadron State College faculty
Minnesota State University, Mankato faculty
20th-century American sculptors
20th-century American male artists
American male sculptors
Sculptors from New York (state)
20th-century African-American artists